The 2003 Cincinnati Bearcats football team represented the University of Cincinnati in the 2003 NCAA Division I-A football season. The team, coached by Rick Minter, played its home games in Nippert Stadium, as it has since 1924.

Schedule

Awards and milestones

Conference USA honors

Offensive player of the week
Week 4: Richard Hall

Defensive player of the week
Week 3: Trent Cole

All-Conference USA First Team
Kyle Takavitz, OG
Trent Cole, DE

All-Conference USA Second Team
Andre Frazier, DE
Daven Holly, DB
Zach Norton, DB

All-Conference USA Third Team
Jamar Enzor, LB

References

Cincinnati
Cincinnati Bearcats football seasons
Cincinnati Bearcats football